Metter is a city in Candler County, Georgia, United States. The population was 4,004 at the 2010 census. The city is the county seat of Candler County.

History
Metter was founded in 1889. In 1914, Metter was designated seat of the newly formed Candler County. Metter was incorporated as a town in 1903 and as a city in 1920.

Geography 

Interstate 16 touches the southern edge of the city, leading east  to Savannah, and west  to Macon. A short, tree-lined parkway leads from I-16 to the downtown area.

Longtime residents use the slogan "Everything's Better in Metter".

Metter may be best known as the home of "The Sower", Michael Guido, who has delivered short evangelical PSAs on late-night television nationwide for decades. Dr. Guido's messages were filmed at Guido Gardens, which houses a public botanical garden and a school of ministry. Guido died at the age of 94 on February 22, 2009. His messages were aired on TV stations in the Georgia and South Carolina region.

A prominent event in Metter is Another Bloomin' Festival, an arts and crafts festival held the day before Easter. The festival draws thousands of out-of-town residents, who come to enjoy homemade desserts, barbecue, and crafts. In addition, it serves as a homecoming celebration for former residents who have returned to celebrate the holiday with their families.

Climate

Demographics

2020 census

As of the 2020 United States census, there were 4,004 people, 1,455 households, and 1,018 families residing in the city.

2000 census
As of the census of 2000, there were 3,879 people, 1,371 households, and 919 families residing in the city. The racial makeup of the city was 55.04% White, 40.99% African American, 0.44% Asian, 3.07% from other races, and 0.46% from two or more races. Hispanic or Latino of any race were 5.26% of the population.

There were 1,371 households, out of which 31.2% had children under the age of 18 living with them, 44.0% were married couples living together, 19.5% had a female householder with no husband present, and 32.9% were non-families. 29.5% of all households were made up of individuals, and 15.2% had someone living alone who was 65 years of age or older.  The average household size was 2.58 and the average family size was 3.16.

In the city, the population was spread out, with 25.5% under the age of 18, 9.3% from 18 to 24, 22.9% from 25 to 44, 22.3% from 45 to 64, and 20.1% who were 65 years of age or older.  The median age was 38 years. For every 100 females, there were 89.9 males.  For every 100 females age 18 and over, there were 84.2 males.

The median income for a household in the city was $21,288, and the median income for a family was $28,073. Males had a median income of $24,935 versus $18,311 for females. The per capita income for the city was $14,308.  About 26.5% of families and 33.3% of the population were below the poverty line, including 57.7% of those under age 18 and 28.6% of those age 65 or over.

Education

Candler County School District 
The Candler County School District holds pre-kindergarten to grade twelve, and consists of an elementary school, a middle school and a high school. The district has 117 full-time teachers and over 1,930 students.

Elementary schools
Metter Elementary School

Middle school
Metter Middle School

High school
Metter High School

Notable people

LaVon Mercer (born 1959), American-Israeli basketball player

References

External links
City of Metter official website

Cities in Georgia (U.S. state)
Cities in Candler County, Georgia
County seats in Georgia (U.S. state)